New Girl is an American television sitcom that premiered on Fox on September 20, 2011. Zooey Deschanel stars as Jessica "Jess" Day, a well-liked and bubbly woman who is trying to get over her surprise breakup with her boyfriend. With the help of her best friend Cece (Hannah Simone), she finds a new place to stay when she moves in with three single guys: Nick Miller (Jake Johnson), an underachieving bartender; Schmidt (Max Greenfield), who thinks of himself as a modern-day Casanova; and Coach (Damon Wayans, Jr.), who leaves the series in the next episode and is replaced by Winston Bishop (Lamorne Morris), a former professional athlete who achieved modest success abroad and is adjusting to life back in the United States. Coach reappears in the series during seasons three, four, five, six, and seven.

On May 14, 2017, the series was renewed for a seventh and final season, which featured eight episodes. On January 4, 2018, it was announced that the seventh and final season would premiere on April 10, 2018, and also it would end with a one-hour series finale, which was aired on May 15, 2018.

Series overview

Episodes

Season 1 (2011–12)

Season 2 (2012–13)

Season 3 (2013–14)

Season 4 (2014–15)

Season 5 (2016)

Season 6 (2016–17)

Season 7 (2018)

Ratings

Notes

References

External links
 
 

New Girl 
New Girl